Pijupara is a village in Kamrup district, situated in northern bank of river Brahmaputra.

Transport
Pijupara is accessible through National Highway 31. All major private commercial vehicles ply between Pubborka and nearby towns.

See also
 Pathimari
 Pitambarhat Bazali

References

Villages in Kamrup district